Hans Bender (5 February 1907 – 7 May 1991) was a German lecturer on the subject of parapsychology, who was also responsible for establishing the parapsychological institute Institut für Grenzgebiete der Psychologie und Psychohygiene in Freiburg. For many years his pipe smoking, contemplative figure was synonymous with German parapsychology.  He was an investigator of 'unusual human experience', e.g. poltergeists and clairvoyants. One of his most famous cases was the Rosenheim Poltergeist.

Life 
After his secondary school examination in 1925, he studied law in Lausanne and Paris. In 1927, he started to study psychology, philosophy, and Romance studies in Freiburg, Heidelberg, and Berlin. From 1929, he studied in psychology in Bonn with Erich Rothacker and Romance studies with Ernst Robert Curtius. He took the doctors degree 1933 by Rothacker with the dissertation Psychische Automatismen. At the time he was an assistant at the Psychological Institute of the University of Bonn, he studied medicine in parallel to the controversial  psychology to get a better reputation. His claim to have made his a state examination for a PhD in medicine by professor Kurt Beringer on the subject of "Die Arbeitskurve unter Pervitin" remained a claim, as he was not able to present the promotion certificate. To eliminate this problem, he drew up a new medical dissertation at old age.

In 1939, he worked as a volunteer at the Psychiatric and Intern Clinic in Freiburg. As he was unfit for the military service, he could act in place of his drafted professor Rothacker in 1940 in Bonn. From September of this year on, he also worked at the Internal Clinic in Bonn. In June, he married Henriette Wiechert, who was "starring" as the experimental subject with the nicknames "Miss Dora D." or "Miss D." in his dissertation.

In order to have a successful career, Bender had already joined the NSDAP at that time. To be able to call himself an associate professor at the newly founded Reichsuniversität Straßburg, he was habilitated in 1941 with the treatise on the subject "Experimentelle Visionen. Ein Beitrag zum Problem der Sinnestäuschung, des Realitätsbewusstseins und der Schichten der Persönlichkeit". With the intervention of the historian Ernst Anrich, he became from the Reichsministerium for Sciences, Education and public instruction the necessary lectureship. From 1942 to 1944, he taught psychology and clinical psychology, also managing the Paracelsus Institute, where Bender originally planned to make research on the subject of astrology. At the request of his patron Friedrich Spieser, he studied the subject of dowsing.

After his detention in a British camp between November 1944 and July 1945, he returned to Freiburg im Breisgau, where he was got a lectureship for psychology. In 1950, he founded the non-university Institute for Frontier Areas of Psychology and Mental Health.

From 1946 to 1949, he acted for the Chair for Psychology and Pedagogy and was a Diätendozent afterwards. After he made guest professorships in 1951 and 1954, he was appointed as an extraordinary professor for frontier areas of psychology. In 1967, he became a full professor for psychology and frontier areas of psychology. One quarter of subjects were issues of parapsychology. In 1975, he became professor emeritus.

When journalists of the SPIEGEL magazine found out in 1977 that no copy of his medical dissertation could be found, and that Bender also could not produce a promotion certificate, the district attorney brought a procedure because of assuming a false title. To avoid prosecution, Bender promoted again by Manfred Müller-Küppers, with whom he had co-operated in cases of haunting.

Research and activities 

Bender had been skilled in depth psychology and oriented himself mostly by approaches of Pierre Janet and Carl Gustav Jung. From this, it follows that on the one hand, he used mostly a qualitative approach instead of a quantitative one. On the other hand, he held an "animistic" approach in parapsychology instead of a "spiritualistic" one. In parapsychology this means that paranormal phenomena were not treated as influences of spirits, but as a result of the great strain of the "focus person". Because of this approach concerning parapsychological phenomena, he associated the experiments of a sensitive approach with the analysis of an affective approach to parapsychology and neurotic faulty attitudes.

An important result of his studies is the principle of Gleichförmigkeit des Okkulten (similarity or omnipresence of the Occult). He assumed that the omnipresence of such phenomena and experiences in different eras, cultures, regions and strata of society renders them worthwhile studying.

Another feature of his work was his close contact with astrologers, such as Thomas Ring, a friend of his. He was consulting him in astrology both in private and scientific matters. Beside this, he was convinced that his wife had a telepathic connection to him. Seeing in case of doubt in apparently unexplainable experiences something paranormal brought him into criticism. This was not only because of his specialty or his close relation to the mass media, but also his assistants occasional observance that he was not always making thorough research. As an example, he explained in 1982 the haunting case "Chopper" that was proven to be a manipulation of a dental nurse in Neutraubling near to Regensburg headily as authentic to the magazine Die Aktuelle.

His critics alleged him already before this of overseeing manipulation attempts by his focus persons. For instance, the criminal marshal of Herbert Schäfer of the Land Office of Criminal Investigation in Bremen effected a confession of the focus person. Bender had seen the haunting issue "Heinrich Scholz" as authentic in 1965. The focus person, who was a trainee in a china store back then did not only manipulated deliberately in the store, but also during the screening in his laboratory. Bender's assistants countered with expertise that at least some of the manipulations should not have occurred.

The problem of manipulations also exists in the most known haunting case of Bender, "the haunting of Rosenheim", that occurred in an attorney's chancellery between 1967 and 1968. This case was not only documented by Bender and his assistants, but by technicians of the Post Office and the power plant, by the police and physicists of the Max Planck Institute in Munich. Notwithstanding the fact that the physicists wrote in their expert opinion that not all the phenomena observed could be explained with the laws of physics, at least in one case, a manipulation of the focus person, a clerk, could be detected. Bender and his assistants explained the case such that the often psychologically labile focus persons manipulate in order to have the focus of attention, when the real parapsychological phenomena fail to appear.

Critical reception

Dutch journalist and skeptic Piet Hein Hoebens has criticized Bender's investigation claims of the Rosenheim Poltergeist, saying that "No full report of the investigations has ever been published, so we are in no position to check to what extent the parapsychologists have been successful in excluding naturalistic explanations." Hoebens wrote that Bender's accounts of his investigation show that he may not have made a rigorous enough examination of the evidence, which Hoebens deems highly questionable.

Skeptical investigator Joe Nickell described Bender as a paranormal believer unwilling "to draw the obvious conclusion from the evidence." Nickell noted that Bender considered a poltergeist case to have genuine effects even though the subject was discovered to have cheated. According to Nickell "this approach contrasts with that of skeptical investigators who consider one instance of deceit to discredit an entire case".

Publications (selection) 
 Zum Problem der außersinnlichen Wahrnehmung. Ein Beitrag zur Untersuchung des Hellsehens mit Laboratoriumsmethoden in the Zeitschrift für Psychologie 135 (1939), pp. 20–130.
 Psychische Automatismen. Zur Experimentalpsychologie des Unterbewußten und der außersinnlichen Wahrnehmung, Leipzig, 1936.
 Der Okkultismus als Problem der Psychohygiene in Neue Wissenschaft 1 (1950), H. 3, pp. 34–42.
 Zur Entwicklung der Parapsychologie von 1930-1950 in Hans Driesch's Parapsychologie. Die Wissenschaft von den "okkulten" Erscheinungen, Zurich, 1952, pp. 135–176.
 Okkultismus als seelische Gefahr in M. Pfister-Amende (ed.): Geistige Hygiene. Forschung und Gefahr, Basel 1955, pp. 489–499.
 Praekognition im qualitativen Experiment. Zur Methodik der "Platzexperimente" mit dem Sensitiven Gerard Croiset in Zeitschrift für Parapsychologie und Grenzgebiete der Psychologie 1 (1957), pp. 5–35.
 Parapsychische Phänomene als wissenschaftliche Grenzfrage in Freiburger Dies Universitatis 6 (1957/58), pp. 59–84.
 Mediumistische Psychosen. Ein Beitrag zur Pathologie spiritistischer Praktiken in the Zeitschrift für Parapsychologie und Grenzgebiete der Psychologie 2 (1958/1959), pp. 173–200.
 Zur Frage des telepathischen Traumes in H. Thomae, H. (ed.): Bericht über den 22. Kongreß der Deutschen Gesellschaft für Psychologie, Göttingen, 1960, pp. 276–280.
 (with J. Mischo): "Precognition" in dream series I in Zeitschrift für Parapsychologie und Grenzgebiete der Psychologie 4 (1960/61), pp. 114–198.
 (with J. Mischo): "Precognition" in dream series II in Zeitschrift für Parapsychologie und Grenzgebiete der Psychologie 5 (1961), pp. 10–47.
 Formen der Einstellung zur Parapsychologie in Zeitschrift für Parapsychologie und Grenzgebiete der Psychologie 7 (1964), pp. 85–92.
 Astrologie und Aberglaube in Neue Wissenschaft 12 (1964), H. 1, pp. 1–23.
 Erich Rothacker 1888-1965 in Zeitschrift für Parapsychologie und Grenzgebiete der Psychologie 9 (1966), 149f.
 Neue Entwicklungen in der Spukforschung in Zeitschrift für Parapsychologie und Grenzgebiete der Psychologie 12 (1966), pp. 1–18.
 Telepathie und Hellsehen als wissenschaftliche Grenzfragen in Schopenhauer-Jahrbuch auf das Jahr 1967, pp. 36–52.
 (with J. Mischo): A prosecutor confronted with "weirdness" in Zeitschrift für Parapsychologie und Grenzgebiete der Psychologie 12 (1970), pp. 255–259.
 (Ed.): Parapsychologie - Development, Results, and Problems, Darmstadt 1974.
 Psychohygienische und forensische Aspekte der Parapsychologie in G. Condreau (ed.): Die Psychologie des 20. Jahrhunderts, Bd. 15, Zürich 1979, pp. 651–672.
 W.H.C. Tenhaeff (1894–1980) in Zeitschrift für Parapsychologie und Grenzgebiete der Psychologie 23 (1981), pp. 231–236.
 Telepathy, second sight, and psychokinesis, Munich 1983.
 Dealings with the Occult, Freiburg 1984.
 A positive critic of superstition in R. Pilkington (ed.): The Men and Women of Parapsychology, Jefferson, N.C. 1987, pp. 114–118.

See also
C. T. K. Chari

References

Further reading 
 Contributions to Men and Women of Parapsychology: Personal Reflections by Rosemarie Pilkington, Page 113, 1987, McFarland & Co Inc Pub,

External links
 Hans Bender: Life and Work
 Short History of Parapsychology in Germany
 Institute for Frontier Areas of Psychology and Mental Health

1907 births
1991 deaths
German psychologists
Parapsychologists
Scientists from Freiburg im Breisgau
People from the Grand Duchy of Baden
University of Freiburg alumni
Academic staff of the University of Freiburg
Heidelberg University alumni
Humboldt University of Berlin alumni
University of Bonn alumni
20th-century psychologists